"Bumped" is a song by English pop group Right Said Fred, released in October 1993 as the first single off their album, Sex and Travel (1993). The song was notable for its commercial underperformance considering the group's previous success; in August 2001, ex-manager Guy Holmes noted on the BBC retrospective documentary I Love 1991 that over £100,000 was spent on the Wayne Isham-directed music video to make up for the fact that "the record wasn't really very good".

Critical reception
Alan Jones from Music Week gave "Bumped" four out of five and named it Pick of the Week, writing, "This is a vaguely oriental mid-tempo piece with a pleasing chorus and some chiming synth strings. The 12-inch features credible Joey Negro dance mixes, which look like giving the Freds their biggest Club Chart success. This combination of factors should ensure their winning streak continues."

Track listing
 UK CD single
 "Bumped" (Radio version)
 "Bumped" (Aschun Mix)
 "Bumped" (City Mix)
 "Turn Me On" (Re-Wrap version)

Charts

References

1993 singles
Right Said Fred songs
1993 songs
EMI Records singles
Songs written by Richard Fairbrass
Songs written by Fred Fairbrass
Songs written by Rob Manzoli